Emilio Sánchez was the defending champion, but lost in the semifinal to Horacio de la Peña.

De la Peña won the title, by defeating Karel Nováček 6–4, 7–6(7–4), 2–6, 6–2 in the final.

Seeds
All seeds received a bye to the second round.

Draw

Finals

Top half

Section 1

Section 2

Bottom half

Section 3

Section 4

References

External links
 Official results archive (ATP)
 Official results archive (ITF)

Singles
Austrian Open Kitzbühel